Xenophrys oropedion is a species of frog in the family Megophryidae from East Khasi Hills District, Meghalaya, India.

References

oropedion
Endemic fauna of India
Amphibians of India
Amphibians described in 2013